The Church of the Most Holy Name of Mary at the Trajan Forum is a Roman Catholic church in Rome, Italy. This church should not be confused with the church Santissimo Nome di Maria in Via Latina in south-east Rome. 

The pale marble church stands in front of the Column of Trajan, a few dozen steps from the similarly domed, but externally more colorful, church of Santa Maria di Loreto.

History 
The feast of the Holy Name of Mary was instituted by Pope Innocent XI after the victory of the Austrian-Polish armies under the command of John III Sobieski over the Turks at the Battle of Vienna in 1683. Abbot Giuseppe Bianchi instituted  devotion to the most holy name of Mary in 1685 at Santo Stefano del Cacco, and soon afterwards established the Confraternity of the Most Holy Name of Mary, which was formally approved in 1688. Members included Pope Innocent XI and Leopold I, Holy Roman Emperor. It was later raised to an Archconfraternity. Every year up until 1870, the members would walk in procession on the Feast of the Holy Name of Mary to the church of Santa Maria della Vittoria, stopping at the Quirinal Palace for the pope's blessing.

In 1694, the confraternity moved to San Bernardo a Colonna Traiani, but the next year, realizing that they needed to build a new church, they acquired the adjacent plot and had Santissimo Nome di Maria built by the French architect Antoine Derizet (1736-1741).

Description
The lower exterior is decorated by columns and pilasters. The interior is elliptical. There are seven small chapels, decorated in polychrome marble.

In 1748, San Bernardo was demolished, but the icon of Mary had been transferred from it to the new church in 1741. Once a year, it is carried in solemn procession from the site of San Bernardo to its present place above the high altar of Santissimo Nome di Maria.

Titular holders 
In 1969, Pope Paul VI made it a Titular Church. Cardinal-deacons of Santissimo Nome di Maria al Foro Traiano:

Sergio Guerri (28 April 1969 – 15 March 1992)
Darío Castrillón Hoyos (21 February 1998 – 18 May 2018)
Mauro Gambetti (28 November 2020 – present)

See also
 History of early modern period domes

References

External links 

 
 

Nome Di Maria
Baroque architecture in Rome
Roman Catholic churches completed in 1741
Nome di Maria
18th-century Roman Catholic church buildings in Italy